Rensga Hits! is a Brazilian musical drama television series created by Carolina Alckmin and Denis Nielsen that premiered on 3 August 2022, on Globoplay. The series is inspired by the industry of the Sertanejo music style in Brazil. It stars Alice Wegmann, Deborah Secco, Lorena Comparato and Fabiana Karla.

Cast

Main 
 Alice Wegmann as Raíssa Bárbara Medeiros
 Deborah Secco as Marlene Sampaio
 Lorena Comparato as Gláucia Figueira
 Fabiana Karla as Helena Maravilha
 Maurício Destri as Enzzo Gabriel
 Mouhamed Harfouch as Isaías Silva
 Alejandro Claveaux as Deivid Cafajeste
 Jeniffer Dias as Thamyres "Thamy"
 Sidney Santiago as Theo
 Maíra Azevedo as Carol
 Samuel de Assis as Kevin Costa

Recurring and guest stars 
 Ernani Moraes as Zé Roberto Figueira "Guarariba"
 Lúcia Veríssimo as Maria Abadia Medeiros
 Rafa Kalimann as Paloma
 Ivan Mendes as Rodrigo Rodrigues
 Stella Miranda as Maria Alvina Medeiros
 Guida Vianna as Maria Amália Medeiros
 Naiara Azevedo as herself
 Gabeu as himself
 Gali Galó as himself

Episodes

Music 

The soundtrack of the series was released on 5 August 2022.

References

External links 
 

2020s Brazilian television series
2022 Brazilian television series debuts
Portuguese-language television shows
Globoplay original programming
Brazilian drama television series